Picciotto may refer to:

People
 Concepción Picciotto (1936–2016), Spanish-American peace activist
 Cyril Moses Picciotto (1888–1940), British barrister, writer and politician
 Danielle de Picciotto, American-born artist, musician and film maker in Germany
 Edgar de Picciotto, Swiss banker
 Guy Picciotto (born 1965), American singer, songwriter, guitarist, musician, and producer
 Irva Hertz-Picciotto (born 1948), American environmental epidemiologist
 Marina Picciotto (born 1963), American neuroscientist
 Joseph de Picciotto Bey (1872–1938), Egyptian senator and economist
 Nora Picciotto (born 1942), Egyptian noble and model
 Sol Picciotto (born 1942), British professor of law

Other uses 
 Picciotto (Mafia), a rank of Mafia associate
 Mount Picciotto, a mountain in Antarctica

Italian-language surnames
Occupational surnames